The Hinthagon Pagoda is a shrine in Bago, Myanmar.  It is a popular tourist destination as it was named after the mythological Hintha bird, a symbol of the Mon people.

The monastery is situated on top of a hill that, according to Myanmar legend, was the only point rising from the sea where the Hintha bird could land.  Paintings and carvings of the Hamsa are visible throughout the temple.

The Shwemawdaw Pagoda (tallest pagoda in Myanmar) can be viewed to the east, making it a popular view point.

References

External links
 

Pagodas in Myanmar
10th-century Buddhist temples